Buchwaldoboletus brachyspermus is a species of bolete fungus in the family Boletaceae native to Martinique.

Taxonomy and naming 
Originally described by David Norman Pegler as Pulveroboletus brachyspermus in  1983, it was given its current name by Ernst Both and Beatriz Ortiz-Santana in A preliminary survey of the genus Buchwaldoboletus, published in „Bulletin of the Buffalo Society of Natural Sciences” in 2011.

Description 
The cap is convex and viscid. Its color is brown. Unlike many Buchwaldoboletus species, the skin is not separated from the flesh by a thin gelatinous layer. The pores are small and angular, olivaceous yellow, bruising greenish blue. The stipe is russet-colored with a yellow floccose layer over the basal area, and there is a yellow bluing mycelium at the stipe base.

Spores are small and measure 4.7–6.2 by 3.5–4.2 µm.

Distribution and ecology 
Buchwaldoboletus brachyspermus has been recorded in Martinique, growing on decaying wood of dicotyledon plants in xero-mesophytic forests.

References

External links 

 

Boletaceae
Fungi described in 1983
Fungi of the Caribbean